AFI may refer to:

 Address-family identifier, a 16 bit field of the Routing Information Protocol
 Ashton Fletcher Irwin, an Australian drummer
 AFI (band), an American rock band
 AFI (2004 album), a retrospective album by AFI released in 2004
 AFI (2017 album), the tenth studio album by AFI
 Afi, Iran, a village in East Azerbaijan Province, Iran
  (Federal Investigations Agency), a Mexican agency
 Air Force Instruction, documented instructions for members of the United States Air Force
 Akrukay language
 Alliance for Financial Inclusion, an organization of central bank regulators from the developing world
 American Film Institute, an independent non-profit film organization
 American Football Israel, a nonprofit sports organization
 Amniotic fluid index, a measure of the amount of amniotic fluid of a fetus
 Aniridia Foundation International, a support organization for people with Aniridia and family members 
 Application Family Identifier, an 8 bit field of an RFID tag
 Aquarium Fish International, a monthly magazine
 Armed Forces Insurance, insurance company for American military professionals
 Association des Femmes Ivoiriennes, women's organization in the Ivory Coast
 Australian Film Institute, an organisation that promotes Australian film and television
 Nikon AF-I, a type of Nikon F-mount lens
 Agencia Federal de Inteligencia, the Argentine national intelligence agency
 Actual flip-angle imaging, a type of Magnetic resonance imaging(MRI)